The Meta Sudans (Latin: "sweating turning post") was a large monumental conical fountain in ancient Rome.

The Meta Sudans was built some time between 89 and 96  under the Flavian emperors, a few years after the completion of the nearby Colosseum. It was built between the Colosseum and the Temple of Venus and Roma, close to the later Arch of Constantine, at the juncture of four regions of ancient Rome: regions I, III, IV, X (and perhaps II).

A meta was a tall conical object in a Roman circus that stood at either end of the central spina, around which racing chariots would turn. The Meta Sudans had the same shape, and also functioned as a similar kind of turning point, in that it marked the spot where a Roman triumphal procession would turn left from the via Triumphalis along the east side of the Palatine onto the via Sacra and into the Forum Romanum itself.

The Meta Sudans was built of a brick and concrete core, faced with marble. It seems to have "sweated" the water (sudans means "sweating"), rather than jetting it out the top. This may mean that it oozed out the top, or perhaps that water came from holes in its side. The monument is estimated to have stood up to 17 m tall; until the 20th century, its concrete core was still over 9 m high. It had a base pool 16 m wide and 1.4 m deep.

The fountain was obviously damaged in the Middle Ages because it already appears as a ruin in early views of the Colosseum. Photos from the end of the 19th century show a conical structure of solid bricks next to the Arch of Constantine, surrounded by its own original, reflecting stone pool. The ruins of Meta Sudans survived until the 20th century. In 1936 Benito Mussolini had its remains wantonly demolished and paved over to make room for the new traffic circle around the Colosseum. A commemorative plaque was set in the road. Although the above-ground structure is gone, its foundations were later re-excavated, revealing the extensive substructure. After another excavation in 1997-98 the traffic circle was closed and the area became a pedestrian district.

Extensive excavations directed by Clementina Panella of the University of Rome "La Sapienza" have revealed extensive archaeological information about the Meta Sudans and the northeast slope of the Palatine Hill.

References

Sources
 "Meta Sudans" From Samuel Ball Platner, A Topographical Dictionary of Ancient Rome, rev. Thomas Ashby. Oxford, 1929, p. 340-341.
 Coarelli, Filippo, Guida Archeologica di Roma, Milano: Arnoldo Mondadori Editore, 1989, .
 Claridge, Amanda, Rome: An Oxford Archaeological Guide, New York: Oxford University Press, 1998, .
 ROMA – VALLE DEL COLOSSEO – PALATINO NORD-ORIENTALE
 Panella, Clementina. 1996. Meta sudans. I: Un'area sacra in Palatio e la valle del Colosseo prima e dopo Nerone. Rome: Istituto poligrafico e zecca dello stato : Libreria dello Stato.

External links

Meta Sudans article on LacusCurtius web site.
Conjectured reconstruction of the Meta Sudans
Description in the site of the "Soprintendenza Speciale per il Colosseo, il MNR e l'Area Archeologica di Roma"

Buildings and structures completed in the 1st century
Ancient Roman buildings and structures in Rome
Rome R. I Monti